Elisa Coclite (born 22 March 2003), known professionally as Casadilego, is an Italian singer, most known for winning the fourteenth season of the Italian talent show X Factor. Her stage name literally means Lego-House, after the Ed Sheeran's song of the same name.

Biography

Early life 
Elisa Coclite was born in 2003 and grew up in Montorio al Vomano. Her father is the jazz pianist Massimiliano Coclite.

2020–present: X Factor Italia and career 
She won the fourteenth edition of the Italian version of the X Factor in 2020, with her single "Vittoria" co-written by Mara Sattei. During the third live show on 12 November 2020, she also performed her second single entitled "Lontanissimo". On 11 December 2020, one day after the finale, she released her debut EP Casadilego.

Together with Francesco Renga, she performed Ornella Vanoni's "Una ragione di più" during the third evening of the Sanremo Music Festival 2021.

On 16 July 2021, she released her first single after X Factor, entitled "Millepiani".

Discography

Extended plays

Singles

Album appearances

Filmography

References

Italian pop singers
Living people
The X Factor winners
X Factor (Italian TV series) contestants
People from Abruzzo
21st-century Italian singers
2003 births
21st-century Italian women singers